Plankalkül is a programming language designed for engineering purposes by Konrad Zuse  between 1942 and 1945. It was the first high-level programming language to be designed for a computer.

Kalkül is the German term for a formal system—as in Hilbert-Kalkül, the original name for the Hilbert-style deduction system—so Plankalkül refers to a formal system for planning.

History of programming
In the domain of creating computing machines, Zuse was self-taught, and developed them without knowledge about other mechanical computing machines that existed already – although later on (building the Z3) being inspired by Hilbert's and Ackermann's book on elementary mathematical logic (see Principles of Mathematical Logic). To describe logical circuits, Zuse invented his own diagram and notation system, which he called "combinatorics of conditionals". After finishing the Z1 in 1938, Zuse discovered that the calculus he had independently devised already existed and was known as propositional calculus. What Zuse had in mind, however, needed to be much more powerful (propositional calculus is not Turing-complete and is not able to describe even simple arithmetic calculations). In May 1939 he described his plans for the development of what would become Plankalkül. He wrote the following in his notebook:

While working on his doctoral dissertation, Zuse developed the first known formal system of algorithm notation capable of handling branches and loops. In 1942 he began writing a chess program in Plankalkül. In 1944, Zuse met with the German logician and philosopher Heinrich Scholz, who expressed appreciation for Zuse's utilization of logical calculus. In 1945, Zuse described Plankalkül in an unpublished book. The collapse of Nazi Germany, however, prevented him from submitting his manuscript.

At that time the only two working computers in the world were ENIAC and Harvard Mark I, neither of which used a compiler, and ENIAC needed to be reprogrammed for each task by changing how the wires were connected.

Although most of his computers were destroyed by Allied bombs, Zuse was able to rescue one machine, the Z4, and move it to the Alpine village of Hinterstein (part of Bad Hindelang).

Unable to continue building computers – which was also forbidden by the Allied Powers – Zuse devoted his time to the development of a higher-level programming model and language. In 1948 he published a paper in the Archiv der Mathematik and presented at the Annual Meeting of the GAMM. His work failed to attract much attention. In a 1957 lecture, Zuse expressed his hope that Plankalkül, "after some time as a Sleeping Beauty, will yet come to life." He expressed disappointment that the designers of ALGOL 58 never acknowledged the influence of Plankalkül on their own work. 

Plankalkül was more comprehensively published  in 1972. The first compiler was implemented by Joachim Hohmann in his 1975 dissertation. Other independent implementations followed in 1998 and 2000 at the Free University of Berlin.

Description
Plankalkül has drawn comparisons to the language APL, and to relational algebra. It includes assignment statements, subroutines, conditional statements, iteration, floating-point arithmetic, arrays, hierarchical record structures, assertions, exception handling, and other advanced features such as goal-directed execution. The Plankalkül provides a data structure called generalized graph (verallgemeinerter Graph), which can be used to represent geometrical structures.

Many features of the Plankalkül reappear in later programming languages; an exception is its idiosyncratic two-dimensional notation using multiple lines.  

Some features of the Plankalkül:
 only local variables
 functions do not support recursion
 only supports call by value
 composite types are arrays and tuples
 contains conditional expressions
 contains a for loop and a while loop
 no goto

Data types
The only primitive data type in the Plankalkül is a single bit or boolean ( – yes-no value in Zuse's terminology). It is denoted by the identifier . All the further data types are composite, and build up from primitive by means of "arrays" and "records".

So 4-bit sequence could be written like L00L, but in cases where such a sequence represents a number, the programmer could use the decimal representation 9.

Type in Plankalkül consists of 3 elements: structured value, pragmatic meaning and possible restriction on possible values. User defined types are identified by letter A with number, like  – first user defined type.

Examples
Zuse used a lot of examples from chess theory:

Identifiers
Identifiers are alphanumeric characters with a number. There are the following kinds of identifiers for variables:

 Input values — marked with a letter V.
 Intermediate, temporary values — marked with a letter Z.
 Constants — marked with a letter С.
 Output values — marked with a letter R.

Particular variable of some kind is identified by number, written under the kind. For example:

Programs and subprograms are marked with a letter P, followed by a program (and optionally a subprogram) number. For example , .

Output value of program   saved there in variable  is available for other subprograms under the identifier , and reading value of that variable also means executing related subprogram.

Accessing elements by index
Plankalkül allows access for separate elements of variable by using "component index". When, for example, program receives input in variable  of type  (game state), then  — gives board state,  — piece on square number i, and  bit number j of  that piece.

In modern programming languages, that would be described by notation similar to V0[0], V0[0][i], V0[0][i][j] (although to access a single bit in modern programming languages a bitmask is typically used).

Two-dimensional syntax
Because indexes of variables are written vertically, each Plankalkül instruction requires multiple rows to write down.

First row contains variable kind, then variable number marked with letter V, then indexes of variable subcomponents marked with K, and then marked with S, which describes variable type. Type is not required, but Zuse notes that this helps with reading and understanding the program.

Examples:

Indexes could be not only constants. Variables could be used as indexes for other variables, and that is marked with a line, which shows in which component index would value of variable be used:

Assignment operation
Zuse introduced in his calculus an assignment operator, unknown in mathematics before him. He marked it with «», and called it yields-sign. Use of concept of assignment is one of the key differences between math and computer science.

Zuse wrote that expression:
 

is analogous to more traditional mathematical equation:

 

There are claims that Konrad Zuse initially used the glyph  as a sign for assignment, and started to use  under the influence of Heinz Rutishauser. Knuth and Pardo believe that Zuse always wrote , and that  was introduced by publishers of «Über den allgemeinen Plankalkül als Mittel zur Formulierung schematisch-kombinativer Aufgaben» in 1948. In the ALGOL 58 conference in Zurich, European participants proposed to use for assignment character introduced by Zuse, but the American delegation insisted on :=.

The variable that stores the result of an assignment (l-value) is written to the right side of assignment operator. First assignment to the variable is considered to be a declaration.

The left side of assignment operator is used for expression, that defines which value will be assigned to variable. Expressions could use arithmetic operators, boolean operators, and comparison operators ( etc.).

Exponentiation operation is written similarly to the indexing operation - using lines in 2d notation:

Control flow

Terminology
Zuse called a single program a Rechenplan ("computation plan"). He envisioned what he called a Planfertigungsgerät ("plan assembly device"), which would automatically translate the mathematical formulation of a program into machine-readable punched film stock.

Example
The original notation was two dimensional. For a later implementation in the 1990s, a linear notation was developed.

The following example defines a function max3 (in a linear transcription) that calculates the maximum of three variables:

 P1 max3 (V0[:8.0],V1[:8.0],V2[:8.0]) → R0[:8.0]
 max(V0[:8.0],V1[:8.0]) → Z1[:8.0]
 max(Z1[:8.0],V2[:8.0]) → R0[:8.0]
 END
 P2 max (V0[:8.0],V1[:8.0]) → R0[:8.0]
 V0[:8.0] → Z1[:8.0]
 (Z1[:8.0] < V1[:8.0]) → V1[:8.0] → Z1[:8.0]
 Z1[:8.0] → R0[:8.0]
 END

See also
 History of programming languages
 Timeline of programming languages
 List of programming languages

Notes

References

 
 
 Zuse, Konrad (1943), "Ansätze einer Theorie des allgemeinen Rechnens unter besonderer Berücksichtigung des Aussagenkalküls und dessen Anwendung auf Relaisschaltungen", (i.e. Inception of a universal theory of computation with special consideration of the propositional calculus and its application to relay circuits.) unpublished manuscript, Zuse Papers 045/018.
 Zuse, Konrad (1948/49). "Über den allgemeinen Plankalkül als Mittel zur Formulierung schematisch-kombinativer Aufgaben". Arch. Math. 1, pp. 441–449, 1948/49.
Zuse, Konrad (1972). "Der Plankalkül". Gesellschaft für Mathematik und Datenverarbeitung. Nr. 63, BMBW - GMD - 63, 1972.
 (HTML version)

External links
 The "Plankalkül" of Konrad Zuse: A Forerunner of Today's Programming Languages by Friedrich L. Bauer (alternative source)
 Rojas, Raúl, et al. (2000). "Plankalkül: The First High-Level Programming Language and its Implementation". Institut für Informatik, Freie Universität Berlin, Technical Report B-3/2000. (full text)(archived)
 
 
 Bram Bruines: Plankalkul(2010) - Plankalkül described in a formal way

Programming languages created in 1948
Procedural programming languages
Non-English-based programming languages
German inventions of the Nazi period
German inventions
Konrad Zuse
1940s establishments in Germany